Matti Rantanen may refer to:
 Matti Rantanen (accordionist) (born 1952), Finnish accordionist
 Matti Rantanen (chess player) (1911–1996), Finnish chess master
 Matti Rantanen (rally driver) (born 1981), Finnish rally driver